Lieutenant General Richard Prescott (1725–1788) was a British officer, born in England.

Military career
He was appointed a major of the 33rd Regiment of Foot, on 20 December 1756, transferred to the 72nd Regiment of Foot on 9 May 1758, and on 14 December 1761, lieutenant-colonel of the 17th Regiment of Foot, before in May 1762, transferring to the 50th Regiment of Foot, with which regiment he served in the Holy Roman Empire during the Seven Years' War.

He afterward transferred to the 7th Regiment of Foot before he was brevetted colonel in the army on 25 June 1772, before he went to Canada in 1773. On the reduction of Montreal by the Americans in 1775, Colonel Prescott, who had the local rank of brigadier-general, attempted to descend to Quebec with the British troops and the military stores, but was obliged to surrender to the Americans on 17 November. In September 1776, he was exchanged for General John Sullivan. In November he became colonel of his regiment, and in December he was third in command of the expedition against Rhode Island, where he remained in command of the British forces prior to the Battle of Rhode Island.

On Prescott Farm in Rhode Island, he was abducted from his quarters at night on 10 July 1777, by Lieutenant-Colonel William Barton and a force of 40 men including Jack Sisson. The Americans took him to Providence.  Prescott was again exchanged, this time for General Charles Lee.  Prescott resumed his command in Rhode Island, but was almost immediately superseded by Sir Robert Pigot.

He became a major-general, 29 August 1777, and lieutenant-general, 26 November 1782. See "The Capture of Prescott by Lieutenant-Colonel William Barton", an address at the centennial celebration of the exploit, by Jeremiah Lewis Diman (Providence, 1877).

Notes

Further reading

External links
Prescott Farm History in Rhode Island

1725 births
1788 deaths
British Army generals
British Army personnel of the American Revolutionary War
33rd Regiment of Foot officers
72nd Highlanders officers
Royal Leicestershire Regiment officers
Queen's Own Royal West Kent Regiment officers
Royal Fusiliers officers
British Army personnel of the Seven Years' War